The O'Neill School of Public and Environmental Affairs is one of the undergraduate and graduate schools of Indiana University, and is the largest public policy and environmental studies school of its kind in the United States. Founded in 1972, as the Indiana University School of Public and Environmental Affairs, it was the first school to combine public management, policy, and administration with the environmental sciences. The school was founded on the IU Bloomington campus, and today also has a campus at Indiana University – Purdue University Indianapolis (IUPUI). O'Neill School Bloomington is the top ranked school of public affairs in the United States. The school received a facelift and expansion when the Paul O'Neill Graduate Center opened for classes in the Spring 2017 semester due to the growing influx of students. On March 4, 2019, the name was changed to the O'Neill School of Public and Environmental Affairs, in honor of alumnus Paul H. O'Neill, who served as the United States Secretary of the Treasury in 2001–2002.

Curriculum

O'Neill School of Public and Environmental Affairs is a unique institution with an interdisciplinary character where students can combine environmental science, environmental policy, and public affairs. O'Neill School is home to more than 90 full-time faculty members and 2,800 students. Indiana University's other highly ranked schools and programs complement the school's offerings; the school has 15 joint programs in social and natural sciences and professional fields. For example, in conjunction with the Department of Political Science, O'Neill School offers a Joint Ph.D. Program in Public Policy, the only one of its kind in the country. As another example, students interested in environmental studies can focus on the science or the public policy aspect under the same roof; under the separate degrees of B.S. Public Affairs where one can do Environmental Management as their major or B.S. Environmental Science as their degree.

Rankings
In the 2022 "Best Graduate Schools" survey by U.S. News & World Report, O'Neill School (SPEA) Bloomington was ranked first in the U.S. among MPA programs. In terms of specialties, O'Neill School (SPEA) was ranked as follows:

 1st in Environmental Policy and Management
 1st in Nonprofit Management
 1st in Public Finance and Budgeting
 2nd in Public Management & Leadership
 2nd in Public Policy Analysis
 6th in Health Policy & Management
 8th in Social Policy
 9th in Local Government Management
 22nd in Urban Policy

In 2019, the Academic Ranking of World Universities ranked the O'Neill School as best in the world in the field of public administration.

O'Neill School (SPEA) Bloomington is also a founding member of the Council of Environmental Science Deans and Directors.

At the doctoral level, both the PhD in Public Affairs and the PhD in Public Policy have been top-ranked by the US National Research Council.

Student life
O'Neill School of Public and Environmental Affairs Bloomington supports the Civic Leaders Center, a residential facility for freshmen from across the Indiana University campus who are interested in politics, economics, public affairs and the environment. It is located at the Briscoe Residence Center.

Students have taken the initiative to organize several clubs such as the Nonprofit Management Association, the Environmental Management and Sustainable Development Association, Students Taking Active Roles Today (START), the International Public Affairs Association, Latin American Policy Association, and the Diversity Project, among others.

At IUPUI, the O'Neill School advises and supports the Justice and Pre-Law Community for freshmen living in The Tower who are interested in social justice. O'Neill Indianapolis students also created and implement publicINreview, and online journal focusing on regional issues in public affairs. Select criminal justice students also serve as cadets on the campus police force.

In addition, the Graduate Student Association works closely between students, faculty and staff, to coordinate communication among them and offer opportunities for leadership and involvement to the school's masters students. Elected officers attend regular meetings with faculty and staff to discuss programs, policies and other aspects of the O'Neill School of Public and Environmental Affairs experience. Active members attend committee meetings and coordinate projects, trips, activities and parties. Every person in the professional masters programs at the O'Neill School in Bloomington is a member of the school's Graduate Student Association (GSA).

Institutes and centers
 Public Policy Institute
 Manufacturing Policy Initiative
 Center for Research in Energy and the Environment
 Geographic Information Systems Laboratory
 The Great Lakes Center for Public Affairs and Administration
 Institute for Development Strategies
 Institute for Family and Social Responsibility
 Institute for the Study of Government and the Nonprofit Sector
 Transportation Research Center

Global initiatives
 Vincent and Elinor Ostrom Workshop in Political Theory and Policy Analysis
 Transatlantic Policy Consortium

Naming gift
On March 4, 2019, Indiana University announced the school would be renamed in honor of Paul H. O'Neill, a 1966 graduate of the university. In honor of O'Neill and his $30 million gift to the school, the School of Public and Environmental Affairs became the Paul H. O'Neill School of Public and Environmental Affairs. The gift will go toward funding graduate fellowships, professorships and chairs, undergraduate scholarships, and the creation of a new Center on Leadership in Public Service.

Notable people

Faculty
 Robert Agranoff
 David B. Audretsch
 Lynton K. Caldwell
 John Graham
 Lee H. Hamilton
 Robert Kravchuk
 Elinor Ostrom (Nobel Laureate)
 James L. Perry
 Maureen Pirog
 Edwardo Rhodes
 Kosali Simon
 Jeffrey White
 Vicky J. Meretsky

Alumni
 John Fernandez
 Oksana Markarova
 Paul O'Neill

References

External links
 O'Neill School of Public and Environmental Affairs Homepage
 O'Neill IUPUI Homepage

Indiana University Bloomington
Educational institutions established in 1972
Education in Monroe County, Indiana
Environmental studies institutions in the United States